Seproxetine, also known as (S)-norfluoxetine, is a selective serotonin reuptake inhibitor (SSRI). It is the S enantiomer of norfluoxetine, the main active metabolite of the widely used antidepressant fluoxetine; but little is known about its pharmacological actions. Seproxetine was being investigated by Eli Lilly and Company as an antidepressant; however, cardiac side effects were discovered and development was discontinued.

References 

Eli Lilly and Company brands
Human drug metabolites
Trifluoromethyl compounds
Phenol ethers
Selective serotonin reuptake inhibitors